Juan M. Alvarez (born August 9, 1973) is an American former professional baseball player who played four seasons for the Anaheim Angels, Texas Rangers, and Florida Marlins of Major League Baseball

Career
The California Angels signed Alvarez as an amateur free agent on July 25, . He was released by the Angels on October 15, after spending the entire 2001 season in the minor leagues.

On November 30, Alvarez signed with the Texas Rangers. On November 18, he was released by the Rangers and signed with the Florida Marlins on February 5, . Alvarez spent nearly the entire 2003 season in the Marlins' minor league system, appearing in only 9 games, before being released on October 15, 2003.

Alvarez was signed as a free agent by the New York Yankees on February 10, but didn't play a game with the team, being released on April 3. On April 29, the Marlins re-signed him, but was again released on October 15.

Alvarez shares the major league baseball record for most games pitched without a win, at 80.

Post-playing career
Alvarez currently resides in Miami, Florida.

In , Alvarez was the pitching coach for the Everett AquaSox of the Northwest League in the Seattle Mariners' organization.

References

External links

1973 births
Living people
Albuquerque Isotopes players
American expatriate baseball players in Canada
Anaheim Angels players
Baseball coaches from Florida
Baseball players from Florida
Cedar Rapids Kernels players
Cleveland Indians scouts
Edmonton Trappers players
Erie SeaWolves players
Florida Marlins players
Lake Elsinore Storm players
Major League Baseball pitchers
Midland Angels players
Minor league baseball coaches
Oklahoma RedHawks players
St. Thomas Bobcats baseball players
Salt Lake Stingers players
Sportspeople from Coral Gables, Florida
Texas Rangers players
Tulsa Drillers players
Vancouver Canadians players
Coral Gables Senior High School alumni